Fedora is a 1918 American silent drama film directed by Edward José and written by Charles E. Whittaker, after the 1882 play with the same name by Victorien Sardou. The film stars Pauline Frederick, Alfred Hickman, Jere Austin, William L. Abingdon, and John Merkyl (as Wilmuth Merkyl). The film was released on August 4, 1918, by Paramount Pictures. It is not known whether the film currently survives.

Plot
As described in a film magazine, Fedora (Frederick), a Russian princess of wealth and beauty and engaged to Count Vladimir Androvitch (Merkyl), vows to bring the murderer of the Count to justice after he is mysteriously slain. She traces the assassin to Paris and poses as a Russian exile. By the practice of her wiles she induces Louis Ipanoff (Austin) to fall in love with and wrings a confession from him. Ipanoff goes to Fedora's house and reveals the truth of her fiance's death, he having discovered Vladimir in Mme. Ipanoff's bedroom. When Fedora learns of her late fiance's perfidy, she declares her love for Ipanoff and screens him from the police until the Tsar can pardon him and they are finally married.

Cast
Pauline Frederick as Princess Fedora
Alfred Hickman as Gretch
Jere Austin as Louis Ipanoff
William L. Abingdon as Gen. Zariskene
John Merkyl as Count Vladimir Androvitch  (credited as Wilmuth Merkyl)

References

External links

1918 films
1910s English-language films
Silent American drama films
1918 drama films
Paramount Pictures films
American films based on plays
Films based on works by Victorien Sardou
Films directed by Edward José
American black-and-white films
Lost American films
American silent feature films
1918 lost films
Lost drama films
1910s American films